Black Traffic is a fifth studio album by English alternative rock band Skunk Anansie. It was released on 17 September 2012 through 100% Records, earMUSIC and Carosello Records. 
The first single from the album is "I Believed in You" which is about people being disappointed in their politicians.

In 2012 it was awarded a silver certification from the Independent Music Companies Association, which indicated sales of at least 20,000 copies throughout Europe.

Track listing
All tracks written by Skunk Anansie.

Personnel
Skunk Anansie
Skin - vocals; keyboards on "Spit You Out" and "This is Not a Game"
Martin "Ace" Kent - guitar
Richard "Cass" Lewis - bass; keyboards on "Spit You Out", "This is Not a Game" and "Drowning"
Mark Richardson - drums
with: 
François "Frah" Charon, Samaha Achoun - additional voices and guitar on "Spit You Out"
Erika Footman - backing vocals on "Our Summer Kills the Sun"
Anthony Leung - keyboards, programming
Isaac Aryee - keyboards on "Drowning"
Wil Malone - string arrangements and conductor on "I Hope You Get to Meet Your Hero" and "Drowning"

References

2012 albums
Skunk Anansie albums
Warner Records albums
Carosello Records albums
Albums produced by Chris Sheldon